|}

The Jockey Club Stakes is a Group 2 flat horse race in Great Britain open to horses aged four years or older. It is run over a distance of 1 mile and 4 furlongs (2,414 metres) on the Rowley Mile at Newmarket in late April or early May.

History
The event was introduced by the Jockey Club in 1894. It was originally held in the autumn, and was initially run over 1 mile and 2 furlongs.

In the early part of its history, the Jockey Club Stakes was open to horses aged three or older. It sometimes featured one or more of the season's Classic winners. It was extended to 1 mile and 6 furlongs in 1901.

The race continued to be staged in the autumn until 1962. It was switched to the spring and cut to 1 mile and 4 furlongs in 1963. It was subsequently closed to three-year-olds.

The Jockey Club Stakes is currently held on the opening day of Newmarket's three-day Guineas Festival meeting.

The leading contenders from the Jockey Club Stakes often go on to compete in the Coronation Cup. The last to win both races in the same year was Shirocco in 2006.

Records
Most successful horse (2 wins):
 Phardante – 1986, 1987

Leading jockey (7 wins):
 Lester Piggott – Holmbush (1950), Nucleus (1955), Court Prince (1959), St. Paddy (1961), Knockroe (1972), Relay Race (1974), Ardross (1982)

Leading trainer (9 wins):
 Alec Taylor, Jr. – Love Wisely (1897), Sceptre (1903), Sancy (1907), Lemberg (1910), Trois Temps (1914), Prince Chimay (1918), Lady Juror (1922), Inkerman (1923), Book Law (1927)

Winners since 1976

Earlier winners

 1894: Isinglass
 1895: Laveno
 1896: Persimmon
 1897: Love Wisely
 1898: Cyllene
 1899: Flying Fox
 1900: Disguise II
 1901: Pietermaritzburg
 1902: Rising Glass
 1903: Sceptre
 1904: Rock Sand
 1905: St Amant
 1906: Beppo
 1907: Sancy
 1908: Siberia
 1909: Phaleron
 1910: Lemberg
 1911: Stedfast
 1912: Prince Palatine
 1913: Cantilever
 1914: Trois Temps
 1915: Lanius
 1916: Cannobie
 1917: no race
 1918: Prince Chimay
 1919: no race
 1920: Torelore
 1921: Milenko
 1922: Lady Juror
 1923: Inkerman
 1924: Teresina
 1925: Tatra
 1926: Foxlaw
 1927: Book Law
 1928: Toboggan
 1929: Cyclonic
 1930: Pyramid
 1931: Shell Transport
 1932: Firdaussi
 1933: Tai-Yang
 1934: Umidwar
 1935: Plassy
 1936: Precipitation
 1937: Solfo
 1938: Challenge
 1939–44: no race
 1945: Black Peter
 1946: Rising Light
 1947: Esprit de France
 1948: Alycidon
 1949: Dust Devil
 1950: Holmbush
 1951: Pardal
 1952: Mister Cube
 1953: Buckhound
 1954: Brilliant Green
 1955: Nucleus
 1956: Kurun
 1957: Court Harwell
 1958: All Serene
 1959: Court Prince
 1960: Prolific
 1961: St Paddy
 1962: Gaul
 1963: Darling Boy
 1964: Fighting Ship
 1965: Bal Masque
 1966: Alcalde
 1967: Acrania
 1968: Crozier
 1969: Torpid
 1970: Queen of Twilight
 1971: Meadowville
 1972: Knockroe
 1973: Our Mirage
 1974: Relay Race
 1975: Shebeen

See also
 Horse racing in Great Britain
 List of British flat horse races

References

 Paris-Turf:
 Racing Post:

 galopp-sieger.de – Jockey Club Stakes.
 ifhaonline.org – International Federation of Horseracing Authorities – Jockey Club Stakes (2019).
 pedigreequery.com – Jockey Club Stakes – Newmarket.
 

Open middle distance horse races
Newmarket Racecourse
Flat races in Great Britain
1894 establishments in England
Recurring sporting events established in 1894